Ain't Supposed to Die a Natural Death (Tunes from Blackness) is a musical with a book, music, and lyrics by Melvin Van Peebles.  The musical contains some material also on three of Van Peebles' albums, Brer Soul, Ain't Supposed to Die a Natural Death and As Serious as a Heart-Attack, some of which were yet to come out.

The musical is a series of 19 politically outspoken, darkly comic, and sexually charged musical monologues that explore the negative aspects of African-American street life and the ghetto experience. Each character has a painful story to tell in funk, soul, jazz and blues-inflected songs.  The innovative piece, presented in a confrontational, "in your face" style, is a precursor to choreopoem, spoken word, and rap music.  It "contributed to the growing black presence on Broadway."

In 1970, Van Peebles decided to transform some of the albums he had recorded between 1968 and 1970 into a musical.  According to Van Peebles, "The songs were mirroring the incidents that were happening in the streets."  Van Peebles marketed the musical to black audiences in churches "all up and down the fucking East Coast. Ministers have congregations, and the congregations would come with busloads of people."

Productions
The piece was first produced by Black Arts/West at Sacramento State College in Sacramento, California, in 1970.  After ten previews, the Off-Broadway production, directed by Gilbert Moses, opened on October 20, 1971, at the Ethel Barrymore Theatre, then transferred to the Ambassador, for a total run of 325 performances.  The cast included Bill Duke, Albert Hall, Garrett Morris and Beatrice Winde. Ossie Davis and Phylicia Rashad joined the cast in 1972.

In 2004, Classical Theatre of Harlem staged a revival directed by Alfred Preisser, choreographed by Bruce Heath, and featuring Ralph Carter. In 2006, it was presented as theatre in the round in T New York, a small Manhattan cabaret, on weekends only.  The production was scheduled for a 2007 tour of the U.S. East Coast.

In 2021, a Broadway revival was announced. The 2022 production will be directed by Kenny Leon, and Mario Van Peebles will serve as creative producer.

Synopsis
In a poor Black neighborhood, nameless characters rail against a general malaise called "the Man."  Each one begins his or her musical rant with the repetition of one or two signature phrases.  They sing of their frustrations, fears, regrets and pain.  The drama stems from the characters' words about their daily lives.  Act I follows a "normal" day in the ghetto, but Act II graphically depicts a particularly violent day, in which looting and several brutal killings occur.  The characters include a blind beggar, a Malcolm X lieutenant, a pimp, prostitutes, a drag queen, a lesbian, looters, lovers, junkies, a wino, a bag lady, corrupt cops, a disgruntled postal worker, sweatshop workers, and a death row prisoner.  The work begins with the "Star Spangled Banner" and ends with the accusatory "Put a Curse on You."

Song list
Just Don't Make No Sense      
Coolest Place in Town      
You Can Get Up Before Noon Without Being a Square      
Mirror Mirror on the Wall      
Come Raising Your Leg on Me      
You Gotta Be Holdin Out Five Dollars on Me      
Sera Sera Jim      
Catch That on the Corner      
The Dozens      
Funky Girl on Motherless Broadway      
Tenth and Greenwich      
Heh Heh (Chuckle) Good Mornin' Sunshine      
You Ain't No Astronaut      
Three Boxes of Longs Please      
Lilly Done The Zampoughi Every Time I Pulled Her Coattail
I Got the Blood      
Salamaggi's Birthday      
Come on Feet Do Your Thing      
Put a Curse on You

Awards and nominations

Original Broadway production

Soundtrack 

A cast album was released by A&M Records.

Notes

References
2004 Village Voice review
2004 Variety review
2006 New York Times review

External links

Ain't Supposed to Die a Natural Death plot summary & character descriptions at StageAgent.com
NPR interview of Van Peebles about the musical
Announcement of another tour date in 2008

1971 musicals
Broadway musicals